Alberto Santos Dumont Airport is an airport serving Tiltil, a town in the Santiago Metropolitan Region of Chile. The airport is named in honor of Alberto Santos-Dumont, a Brazilian aviation pioneer.

There is high terrain northeast and northwest.

See also

Transport in Chile
List of airports in Chile

References

External links
OpenStreetMap - Alberto Santos Dumont

FallingRain - Alberto Santos Dumont Airport

Airports in Santiago Metropolitan Region